{{Automatic taxobox
| taxon = Tenaturris
| image = Tenaturris sp. 001.jpg
| image_caption = Shell of Tenaturris sp.; museum specimen at MNHN, Paris
| authority = Woodring, 1928 
| synonyms_ref = 
| synonyms =
| type_species = 
| subdivision_ranks = Species
| subdivision = See text
| display_parents = 3
}}Tenaturris is a genus of sea snails, marine gastropod mollusks in the family Mangeliidae.
 
Species
Species within the genus Tenaturris include:
 Tenaturris bartlettii (Dall, 1889)
 Tenaturris concinna (Adams C. B., 1852)
 Tenaturris decora (Smith E. A., 1882)
 Tenaturris dysoni (Reeve, 1846)
 Tenaturris epomis (Dall, 1927)
 Tenaturris fulgens (Smith E. A., 1888)
 Tenaturris gemma (Smith E. A., 1884)
 † Tenaturris guppyi  (W.H. Dall, 1896)  
 Tenaturris inepta (E. A. Smith, 1882)
 † Tenaturris isiola W.P. Woodring, 1928
 Tenaturris janira (Dall, 1919)
 Tenaturris merita (Hinds, 1843)
 Tenaturris multilineata (C. B. Adams, 1845)
 † Tenaturris terpna  W.P. Woodring, 1928
 Tenaturris trilineata (C. B. Adams, 1845)
 Tenaturris verdensis (Dall, 1919)
 Species brought into synonymy
 Tenaturris burchi Hertlein, L.G. & A.M. Strong, 1951: synonym of  Tenaturris verdensis (Dall, 1919)
 Tenaturris dubia (C. B. Adams, 1845): synonym of Pyrgocythara dubia (C. B. Adams, 1845):
 Tenaturris fusca (Adams C. B., 1845): synonym of Pyrgocythara cinctella (Pfeiffer, 1840)
 Tenaturris helenensis E.A. Smith, 1884: synonym of Tenaturris gemma  (E.A. Smith, 1884)
 Tenaturris nereis Pilsbry, H.A. & H.N. Lowe, 1932: synonym of Tenaturris merita (Hinds, 1843) 
 Tenaturris phaethusa (Dall, 1919): synonym of Notocytharella phaethusa (Dall, 1919)
 Tenaturris trifasciata L.A. Reeve, 1845: synonym of Tenaturris trilineata (C.B. Adams, 1845)

References

 W. P. Woodring. 1928. Miocene Molluscs from Bowden, Jamaica. Part 2: Gastropods and discussion of results'' . Contributions to the Geology and Palaeontology of the West Indies

External links
  Bouchet P., Kantor Yu.I., Sysoev A. & Puillandre N. (2011) A new operational classification of the Conoidea. Journal of Molluscan Studies 77: 273-308 
 
 Worldwide Mollusc Species Data Base: Mangeliidae